The King of Jokgu is a 2013 South Korean independent sports comedy film about Jokgu, a Korean cross between football and volleyball. A directorial feature debut by Woo Moon-gi, the film was a surprise hit, attracting over 40,000 viewers, unheard of for an indie comedy in Korea and was one of the most well-received indie films from 2014. It made its world premiere at the 18th Busan International Film Festival in 2013.

Cast
 Ahn Jae-hong as Hong Man-seop
 Hwang Seung-eon as Seo Ahn-na 
 Jung Woo-sik as Kang Min 
 Kang Bong-sung as Park Chang-ho 
 Hwang Mi-young as Lee Mi-rae 
 Park Ho-san as Hyung Gook
 Ryu Hye-rin as Go Woon

Awards and nominations

References

External links
 
 
 

2013 films
2010s Korean-language films
2010s sports comedy films
South Korean sports comedy films
2013 comedy films
2010s South Korean films